Ulla Ebba Ingegerd Billquist, (née Schönström 14 August 1907 – 6 July 1946), was a Swedish female schlager singer. She was mostly successful during the early 1940s.

Personal life
Ulla Billquist married three times; firstly from 1926 to 1934 to the actor Fritiof Billquist (1901–1972), then to the director Wolmar Sjögren (1901–1974) from 1936 to 1942, and finally to the composer, accordionist  and the pianist Gunnar Hahn (1908–2001) in 1943 until her death. At the time of her death, she has been separated from her third husband, Gunnar Hahn since the winter of 1946. They were in the process of divorcing, which has not been finalised when she died.

Discography
 Parfym-visan, Pathé, December 1929
 Ett enda litet finger, Pathé, December 1929
 Fusyjama, Pathé, December 1929
 Vad kvinnan vill, vill du, Pathé, December 1929
 Anna Aurora, Columbia, December 1930
 Vaggvisa, Columbia, December 1930
 Casanova, Columbia, December 1930
 Min soldat (1940)
 Kring de små husen i gränderna vid hamnen (1942)
 Köp rosor, Monsieur (1942)
 Räkna de lyckliga stunderna blott (1944)
 På återseende (1945)

References

Further reading 
 

1907 births
1946 suicides
Burials at Norra begravningsplatsen
Suicides in Sweden
20th-century Swedish women singers
People from Värnamo Municipality